1650 Heckmann, provisional designation , is a rare-type Nysian asteroid from the inner regions of the asteroid belt, approximately 29 kilometers in diameter. It was discovered on 11 October 1937, by German astronomer Karl Reinmuth at Heidelberg Observatory in southern Germany, and later named after astronomer Otto Heckmann.

Classification and orbit 

Heckmann is a member of the Polanian subgroup of the Nysa family of asteroids and shows a rare F-type spectrum in the Tholen classification scheme. It orbits the Sun in the inner main-belt at a distance of 2.0–2.8 AU once every 3 years and 10 months (1,389 days). Its orbit has an eccentricity of 0.16 and an inclination of 3° with respect to the ecliptic.

Rotation period 

French amateur astronomer René Roy obtained the first rotational lightcurve of Heckmann in September 2005. It gave a rotation period of 12.05 hours with a brightness variation of 0.06 in magnitude. A more refined lightcurve with a period of 14.893 hours and an amplitude of 0.16 magnitude was obtained by Australian amateur astronomer David Higgins at the Hunters Hill Observatory and collaborating stations in March 2008. In September 2013, photometric observations at the Palomar Transient Factory, California, gave a low rated lightcurve with a similar period of 14.9042 hours.

Diameter and albedo 

According to the surveys carried out by the Infrared Astronomical Satellite IRAS, the Japanese Akari satellite, and NASA's Wide-field Infrared Survey Explorer with its subsequent NEOWISE mission, Heckmann measures between 24.93 and 35.15 kilometers in diameter, and its surface has an albedo between 0.034 and 0.06. The Collaborative Asteroid Lightcurve Link agrees with the results obtained by IRAS, that is an albedo of 0.0497 and a diameter of 29.07 kilometers with an absolute magnitude of 11.56.

Naming 

This minor planet was named in honor of German astronomer Otto Heckmann (1901–1983), director of the Bergedorf Observatory in Hamburg, president of the International Astronomical Union (1967–1970) and the first director of ESO, the European Southern Observatory, which foundation had been initiated by him. He was active in the fields of cosmology and several aspects of fundamental astronomy. The official  was published by the Minor Planet Center on 20 February 1976.

References

External links 
 Asteroid Lightcurve Database (LCDB), query form (info )
 Dictionary of Minor Planet Names, Google books
 Asteroids and comets rotation curves, CdR – Observatoire de Genève, Raoul Behrend
 Discovery Circumstances: Numbered Minor Planets (1)-(5000) – Minor Planet Center
 
 

001650
Discoveries by Karl Wilhelm Reinmuth
Named minor planets
001650
19371011